Estijak (also Romanized as Estījak; also known as Ashtajak and Īstījak) is a village in Bayat Rural District, Nowbaran District, Saveh County, Markazi Province, Iran. At the 2006 census, its population was 61, in 31 families.

References 

Populated places in Saveh County